Dikoleps pruinosa is a minute species of sea snail, a marine gastropod mollusk in the family Skeneidae.

Description
(Original description by Chaster) The height of the shell attains 1 mm, its diameter 0.6 mm. The shell has a subglobose shape. It is whitish in colour, dull and frosted in appearance, owing to the entire surface being covered with very numerous, fine, close -set, flexuous striae following the direction of the lines of growth. On the umbilical area and adjoining part of the base there are also numerous, much stronger spiral lines, finely granulated by the striae just described. The 2½ whorls are convex. The suture is very distinct though not deep. The spire is a little raised. The aperture is nearly circular. The outer lip is thin, presenting two shallow sinuations, one at the periphery and one below. The umbilicus is rather large. The operculum like that of Dikoleps nitens.

Distribution
This species occurs in the Mediterranean Sea.

References
Notes

Sources
 Gofas, S.; Le Renard, J.; Bouchet, P. (2001). Mollusca, in: Costello, M.J. et al. (Ed.) (2001). European register of marine species: a check-list of the marine species in Europe and a bibliography of guides to their identification. Collection Patrimoines Naturels, 50: pp. 180–213

External links
 

pruinosa
Gastropods described in 1896